Alfred Siegel (born 6 February 1903, date of death unknown) was a German racing cyclist. He rode in the 1930 Tour de France.

References

External links
 

1903 births
Year of death missing
German male cyclists
Place of birth missing
Sportspeople from Wrocław
People from the Province of Lower Silesia